China was the host nation of the 2008 Summer Olympics.
China was represented by the Chinese Olympic Committee (COC), and the team of selected athletes were officially known as Team China.

As the host country, China had a total of 639 athletes qualified for places on the national team, being the largest in its Olympic history. Chinese athletes qualified to compete in all 28 Olympic sports for the first time. Among these athletes, 469 had competed at their first Olympics, 165 in Athens 2004, and 37 in Sydney 2000. Diver Guo Jingjing, shooter Tan Zongliang and basketballer Li Nan, made their fourth Olympic appearances, having first competed in Atlanta 1996. China also included 460 officials, making a total of 1,099 delegates. According to Olympic protocol, China entered as the last nation into the Beijing National Stadium during the opening ceremony, and was led by basketballer Yao Ming and Lin Hao, a 9-year-old primary school student who had rescued two schoolmates during the 2008 Sichuan earthquake.

China dominated the rankings for the first time with 51 gold medals (China was later stripped of 3 golds in weightlifting for doping violations). In 2009, Team China won the Laureus World Sports Awards for the Best Team of the Year. The team excluded athletes from the Special Administrative Region of Hong Kong, which competed separately as Hong Kong, China.

Medalists

China won a total of 100 medals, 48 gold, 22 silver, and 30 bronze, which became its largest ever medal tally in Olympic history. On August 17, 2008, China achieved its greatest ever Olympic performance when the women's table tennis team defeated Singapore in the final to claim the nation's 33rd gold medal, surpassing the previous best tally of 32 at Athens 2004.

Won all medals in one event
 Women's singles table tennis
 Men's singles table tennis
Won all gold medals in one sport
 Table tennis (4 gold)
 Trampoline (2 gold)
Won gold medals in both men's and women's events where only one entry is allowed
 Synchronized 3 metre springboard diving
 Synchronized 10 metre platform diving
 Team all-around gymnastics
 Team table tennis

Archery

As the host nation, China automatically received a full complement of six quota spots (three for men, three for women) for the archery competitions. China's national selection competition resulted in Xue Haifeng, Jiang Lin and Li Wenquan taking the three men's spots, while Zhang Juanjuan, Chen Ling and Guo Dan earned the women's spots. Xue and Zhang were both veteran athletes from 2004 Athens, with the latter taking China's fourth silver medal in archery. On August 14, Zhang Juanjuan became the first Chinese archer to win a gold medal in the women's individual event.

Men

Women

Athletics

Men
Track & road events

Field events

Combined events – Decathlon

Women
Track & road events

Field events

Combined events – Heptathlon

* The athlete who finished in second place, Lyudmila Blonska of the Ukraine, tested positive for a banned substance. Both the A and the B tests were positive, therefore Blonska was stripped of her silver medal, and Liu Haili moved up a position.

Badminton

Men

Women

Mixed

Baseball

The China national baseball team secured automatic qualification as host nation of the Olympics and makes its first appearance at the Olympics. The team's coach is American Jim Lefebvre.

A team of 24 players competed.

Group stage
All times are China Standard Time (UTC+8)

Basketball

Men's tournament
Roster

Group play

Quarterfinals

Women's tournament
Roster

Group play

Quarterfinals

Semifinals

Bronze medal match

Boxing

China qualified ten boxers for the Olympic boxing tournament, far surpassing its guaranteed quota of at least six spots. The flyweight class was the only in which China did not qualify a boxer. Seven of the ten Chinese qualifiers did so at the world championships. Hu, Maimaitituersun and Zhang Xiaoping qualified at the first Asian continental qualifying tournament.

Canoeing

Slalom

Sprint
Men

Women

Qualification Legend: QS = Qualify to semi-final; QF = Qualify directly to final

Cycling

Road

Track
Sprint

Keirin

Omnium

Mountain biking

BMX

Diving

Men

Women

Equestrian

Dressage

Eventing

Show jumping

Fencing

Men

Women

Field hockey

Men's tournament

China's men's team competed in Pool A. Sixteen players were officially enrolled in the squad. Two reserve players were also nominated to be available should a player enrolled in the official squad become injured during the tournament.

Roster

Group play

11th–12th place

Women's tournament

China's women's team competed in Pool A. Sixteen players were officially enrolled in the squad. Two reserve players were also nominated to be available should a player enrolled in the official squad become injured during the tournament.

Roster

Group play

Semifinal

Gold medal match

Football

Men's tournament

A squad of 18 players, 15 of which must have been born on or after 1 January 1985, and 3 of which can be older dispensation players, was selected to represent China at the Games. A minimum of two goalkeepers (plus one optional dispensation goalkeeper) had to be included in the squad.

Roster

Group play

Women's tournament

A squad of 18 players competed for China in the women's competition.

Roster

Group play

Quarterfinals

Gymnastics

Artistic
Men
Team

Individual finals

Women
Team

* Only two gymnasts per country may advance to a final.

Individual finals

Rhythmic

Trampoline

Handball

Men's tournament

The men's handball team had competed for the first time at the Olympics. China was drawn in Group A with Poland, France, Croatia, Brazil and Spain.

Roster

Group play

Women's tournament

Roster

Group play

Quarterfinal

Classification semifinal

5th–6th place

Judo

Men

Women

Modern pentathlon

Rowing

China qualified for 11 of the total 14 rowing events. Zhang Liang was disqualified from the men's single sculls after he forgot the time of his race and failed to turn to the right heat. When Liang finally arrived to take part in the single scull the competition had already finished. "I wrongly remembered my time as that of the third group, but actually it was the second group", he explained. The rules of the International Rowing Federation say if an athlete fails to attend a race he forfeits his right to compete in further races. Therefore, Zhang not only missed the single sculls but also forfeited his right to compete in the double sculls. This meant his action had also automatically disqualified his teammate Su Hui. The China Water Sports Administration appealed the decision but the plea was rejected. "This shows we still have some problems in team organization", commented Wei Di, the director of China's water sports programs.

Men

Women

Qualification Legend: FA=Final A (medal); FB=Final B (non-medal); FC=Final C (non-medal); FD=Final D (non-medal); FE=Final E (non-medal); FF=Final F (non-medal); SA/B=Semifinals A/B; SC/D=Semifinals C/D; SE/F=Semifinals E/F; QF=Quarterfinals; R=Repechage

Sailing

China has qualified for all 11 sailing events.

Men

Women

Open

M = Medal race; EL = Eliminated – did not advance into the medal race; CAN = Race cancelled

Shooting

Men

Women

Softball

A squad of 15 players made up China's women's team at the Games. The team finished sixth in the group stage and did not advance to the medal matches.

All times are China Standard Time (UTC+8)

Results
Group stage All times are China Standard Time (UTC+8)

Swimming

Men

Women

*Participated in the heats only and received medal.

Synchronized swimming

China finished fourth at the 2007 world championships and hoped to medal in the event for the first time ever at the 2008 Summer Olympics. The Chinese were coached by Masayo Imura, the legendary Japanese synchronized swimming instructor.

Table tennis

Men's singles

Women's singles

Team

Taekwondo

* After a successful appeal by the British, judges reversed the result of the match, granting Sarah Stevenson two points for a final round kick to her opponent's head which the judges had previously missed. The reversal of the decision, after video footage was considered, is thought to be a first for the sport.

Tennis

Men

Women

Triathlon

Volleyball

Beach

Indoor
China qualified a team in both the men's and the women's tournaments. The men's team won two of their five group matches, and advanced to the final round, where they lost in the quarterfinal. The women's team won three of their five group matches, and also advanced to the final round. There, they won the quarterfinal, but lost the semifinal. They managed to win their last match, thereby securing the bronze medal.

Men's tournament

Roster

Preliminary round

Quarterfinal

Women's tournament

Roster

Preliminary round

Quarterfinal

Semifinal

Bronze medal match

Water polo

China participated in both the men's and the women's tournaments. The men's team finished in 12th place, while the women's team finished in 5th place.

Men's tournament

Roster

Group play

All times are China Standard Time (UTC+8).

Classification quarter-final

Classification 11th–12th

Women's tournament

Roster

Group play

All times are China Standard Time (UTC+8).

Quarterfinal

Classification 5th–6th

Weightlifting

China automatically qualifies for 6 men's and 4 women's places.

Men

Women

Wrestling

Men's freestyle

Men's Greco-Roman

 Sheng Jiang originally finished fifth, but in November 2016, he was promoted to bronze due to disqualification of Vitaliy Rahimov.

Women's freestyle

Media coverage
The main rights to Olympic coverage in China are held by China Central Television (CCTV). The 2008 Summer Olympics will be the first ever to be broadcast in high definition (HDTV). Besides HDTV, CCTV will broadcast in digital cable TV. Live broadcasts will run on CCTV-1, CCTV-5 and CCTV-12, with re-run broadcasts on CCTV-2 and CCTV-7. CCTV.com, the only official Beijing Olympic Games mobile phone and Internet broadcast platform on the mainland and Macao, will broadcast 3,800 hours of the Olympic Games. CCTV will follow the homegrown mobile TV China Multimedia Mobile Broadcasting (CMMB) standard. China Telecom, China Netcom and Shanghai Media Group will broadcast using Internet Protocol television (IPTV) services. Radio coverage will be provided by China National Radio (CNR). China Mobile will also enable subscribers to catch live results and data.

Major Chinese Internet portals have signed coverage deals with CCTV.com to be Internet Content Services Sponsors: Sina.com, Netease.com, Tencent and  Sohu.com. CCTV has joined with these online partners to run an interactive website offering streaming video broadcasts of events, which will be viewable only in China, and web profiles through which users can contact Olympic athletes. Officials expect 10m to 20m internet users to watch the Olympic Games in China via video streaming. 102m people had watched the games online in China, according to Timo Lumme, marketing director for the IOC. Phoenix TV broadcast the Opening Ceremony

Kit sponsorship
China competed in all 28 Olympic sports. US sportswear company Nike has a sponsorship deal with 22 Chinese sports associations to provide outfits for those Olympic teams at the Beijing Games. Germany's Adidas has the endorsement rights for China's volleyball and football teams while Chinese company Li-Ning is the provider of the shooting, gymnastics, diving and table tennis teams. Yonex is the main sponsor of the China Badminton Team.

See also
China at the 2008 Summer Paralympics
China at the Olympics
Sports in China
Project 119

References

External links

General Sports Administration - Team China - official
2008 Olympic Games in Beijing - official website
Chinese Olympic Committee - official website
The Games of the XXIX Olympiad - Sina.com
Beijing 2008 - China Daily
Beijing 2008 Olympic Games Chinese Sports Delegation Roster - China Interactive Sports

Nations at the 2008 Summer Olympics
2008
08